This article is about the demographic features of the population of Albania, including population density, ethnicity, education level, health of the populace, economic status, religious affiliations and other aspects of the population. The demography of the Albania is monitored by the Institute of Statistics of Albania. The institute has performed demographic censuses since the 1924s. The latest census in Albania was performed in April 2011, and has been deemed as unreliable both within and outside Albania.

Albania is a fairly linguistically homogeneous country with ethnic Albanians forming the majority in the country. Albania had 2,876,591 inhabitants on 1 January 2017, according to the INSTAT calculations.

The first official population statistics for Albania was the 1923 census, when the country had a total of 823,000 inhabitants. Previous censuses carried out by the Ottoman Empire, which are not yet available. A shift in administrative borders in 1913 made comparison of various periods more complicated. Maddison from 2001, estimates that in Albania, about 200,000 people lived up to the year 1600, and that the population grew to 300,000 by 1700, implying an annual average growth rate of 0.4% in that period. However, population growth accelerated from the declaration of independence in 1912 to 1944 to 0.7% per year. This was due in part because Albania had the largest birth rate and the smallest death rate in Europe at the time. After the second World War, population increase policies pursued by the communist government and a large life expectancy fueled a 2.5 percent annual increase for the following 45 years. The growth strained economic resources during communism in a Malthusian fashion that led to the collapse of the regime and the emigration of about 20 to 25 percent of the population in the following two decades. Albania experienced a demographic transition starting from 1960s, when crude birth rates began a slow decline, despite a government policy that called for a population increase. After the 1990s, the population showed an average decline of about 0.3 percent per year, caused by emigration. In the 2001 Census, the population declined to 3,023,000 from almost 3.3 million in 1990.

The latest census in Albania was scheduled for April 2011, and the results will be published in the following months. The permanent population of Albania at the 2011 census had reached 2.83 million. The population density was 98.5 inhabitants per square kilometre, and the overall life expectancy in Albania at birth was 78 years in 2011. For the first time in the history of population censuses in Albania, the population in urban areas (53.7%) was larger than the population of rural areas (46.3%). The Albanian language is the official language, but minority languages are officially used in some local government units. Albanian is declared as the native language by 98.76% of the population. The Albanian people are considered one of the most polyglot nation and people in Europe. They generally speak more than two languages, which are French, Greek, Italian, and English, which are increasing due to migration return, and new Greek and Italian communities in the country. The main religions of Albania are Islam (58.79%), Roman Catholicism (10.02%) and Eastern Orthodoxy (6.75%). The 2011 census on religion and ethnicity has been deemed unreliable by the Council of Europe as well as other internal and external organisations and groups.

Albania has a high Human Development Index of 0.764, ranking 75th in the world in 2016. In 2016, Albania had a total population of 2,786,026, 1,361,326 being males and 1,424,700 females. Otherwise 42,922 inhabitants have left Albania and at the same year the number of immigrants in the country was by 25,846 inhabitants.

Albanian demographics are difficult to ascertain and verify due to political corruption at the local and central level as noted by the Council of Europe.

Population

With a population of 2.87 million in 2017, Albania ranks 136th in the world by population. The population density is 101 inhabitants per square kilometre. The overall life expectancy in Albania at birth is 78 years. The total fertility rate of 1.70 children per mother is one of the lowest in the world. In 2016, the population of Albania was about 2,89 million, comprising 1,447 million male and 1,443 female persons. There were 38,003 live births and 20,737 deaths in Albania. The natural increase of the population was positive, as the number of births exceeded the number of deaths by 17,266. Due to external migration and low birth rate, the population declined by 18,307. The total dependency ratio of population in Albania is 46.8%.

In 2001, the number of households amounted to 726,895. The age structure was under 6 years by 10.8% and 65 years and older by 7.5%. However, the sex ratio amounted to 49.9% males and 50.1% females of the total population. Furthermore, 2,737,614 of the population was older than 6 years. In 2011, the total population was 2,831,741. The comparison of the figures shows that the population has decreased by 7.7% in about ten years. Large scale emigration and fertility decline are supposed to be the main causes of the observed population decrease. A preliminary estimate of the number of persons that refused to participate in the census is 29,355 (1.04%). This figure is based on the number of dwellings for which a refusal was recorded and is included in the total population. The total population is composed of 1,421,810 males (50.2%) and 1,409,931 females (49.8%). For the first time in the history of population censuses in the nation, the population in urban areas is larger than the population of rural areas. According to 2011 census preliminary results, 53.7 percent of the population lives in urban areas and 46.3 percent in rural areas.

The 2011 census is regarded as unreliable and inaccurate by the Council of Europe, showing incompatibility with the protection of national minorities. Also, the World Council of Churches sent letters to the United Nations Human Rights Council regarding the matter, having conducted their own questionnaire which showed major irregularities. It was the first census to include ethnicity, was struck by controversy since according to article 20 of the Census law, there is a $1,000 fine for anyone who declares anything other than what was written down on the individual's birth certificate. Some of the minorities, mainly the Greeks, boycotted the census. The religious affiliation of the population was 56.7% Muslims, 13.79% undeclared, 10.03% Catholics, 6.75% Orthodox believers, 5.49% other, 2.5% Atheists, 2.09% Bektashis and 0.14% other Christians.
 

According to the Institute of Statistics INSTAT, the population in 2016 was 2,886,026. Tirana County is the area with the highest population of 811,649 in the country. Fier County remains the population with the second highest population with a total of 312,488. The Counties with the lowest result are Gjirokastër, Kukës and Dibër respectively with 70,331, 84,035 and 134,153 inhabitants. About 53.4% of Albania's population live in cities. The three largest counties account for half of the population.

Almost 53.4% of the population of Albania living in cities. According to the Institute of Statistics (INSTAT), the three largest counties account for half of the population. Over 1 million people live in Tirana and Durrës, making it the largest urban area in Albania. The area of the capital Tirana, is one of largest cities in the Balkan Peninsula and ranks 7th with a population about 800,000.
The second largest is the port city of Durrës, with a population of 201.110, followed by Vlorë, the largest city in southern Albania, with 141.513 inhabitants. The Institute of Statistics forecast that the population may even increase by less than a fifth from 763.560 by 2011 to 909.252
by 2031, depending on the actual birth rate and the level of net migration.

Population censuses in 1923–2011

Population by Qark/County

Total fertility rate by counties

Vital statistics

Before WWII

After WWII

Source: Institute of Statistics (INSTAT)

Current vital statistics

Marriages and divorces

Ethnic groups

Albania is inhabited mostly by Albanians. In the 2011 official census, 97.8% of those who disclosed their identity were Albanians (82.58% overall), while 2.3% stated other ethnicities (1.9% overall). Albania recognizes nine national minorities. These include Aromanians, Balkan Egyptians, Greeks, Bulgarians, Bosniaks, Macedonians, Montenegrins, Serbs and Roma. As conducting a satisfactory census of ethnic minorities is one of the country's commitments to the European Union, the Government of Albania conducted an official census to clarify the ethnic composition of the population in 2011. However this census was deemed unreliable by internal and external organisations, including the Council of Europe and many of Albania's ethnic minority groups. The last census to include data on ethnic minorities was conducted in 1989. The census conducted in 2001 did not collect information about ethnic groups and nationalities in the population.

Since the 21st century, Albania has also witness a significant settlement of foreign expats into the country, such as Italian, Chinese, Turks, Bengalis, Americans, and other foreign workers. Albania also houses 5,000 Afghan refugees and over 400 Ukrainian refugees.

Religion

The main religions of Albania at the 2011 census were Islam 58.79%, Roman Catholicism 10.02, Eastern Orthodoxy 6.75%, Bektashi 2.09%, Evangelical 0.14%, Atheism 2.50%, 5.50% Nondenominational and 16.30% Others. This census has been recognised as unreliable by numerous internal and external organisations, including the Council of Europe. Religious observance and practice is generally lax and polls have shown that, compared to the populations of other countries, few Albanians consider religion to be a dominant factor in their lives. Today, religion plays an important role in the lives of only 39% of Albanians. In addition, Albania is ranked among the least religious countries in the world.

The Constitution of Albania extends freedom of religion to all citizens and the government generally respects this right in practice. It declares no official religion and provides for equality of all religions. However, the predominant religious communities enjoy a greater degree of official recognition and social status based on their historical presence in the country. All registered religious groups have the right to hold bank accounts and to own property and buildings. Religious freedoms have in large part been secured by the generally amicable relationship among religions. The Ministry of Education has the right to approve the curricula of religious schools to ensure their compliance with national education standards while the State Committee on Cults oversees implementation. There are also 68 vocational training centers administered by religious communities.

Government policy and practice contributed to the generally free exercise of religion. The government is secular and the Ministry of Education asserts that public schools in the country are secular and that the law prohibits ideological and religious indoctrination. Religion is not taught in public schools.

Language

The Albanian language is the official language of Albania. It has two distinct dialects, Tosk, spoken in the south, and Gheg, spoken in the north. The Shkumbin river is the rough dividing line between the two dialects. The language is spoken primarily in Greece, Italy, Kosovo, North Macedonia and Montenegro. Centuries-old communities speaking Albanian-based dialects can be found scattered in Greece (Arvanites), Southern Italy, Sicily and Calabria (Arbëreshë) and in Ukraine. However, due to the large Albanian diaspora, the total number of speakers is much higher than the native speakers in Southern Europe. The four dialects include Tosk Albanian, Gheg Albanian, Arbëresh and Arvanitika.

Albanians are considered of the most polyglot nation and people in Europe. Albanians generally speak more than two languages. These languages are French, Greek, Italian, and English which are increasing due to migration return, and new Greek and Italian communities in the country. Italian is widely spoken throughout Albania. La Francophonie states that 320,000 French speakers can be found in Albania. Greek, the language of the Greek minority of the south, is also very widespread in that region. Nowadays, knowledge of English is growing very rapidly, especially among the youth.

The ethnic minorities languages include Aromanian, Serbian, Macedonian, Bosnian, Bulgarian, Gorani, and Roma. Greek is the largest minority language of the country as well as the first largest foreign language. Approximately 5,000 Macedonian language-speakers can be found in Albania. Most of these living in the southeastern part of the country.

Education 

Literacy in the country is 98.7 percent. The School life expectancy (primary to tertiary education) of Albania is 16 years. The nation ranks 25th out of 167 countries in the World. In 2015, the overall literacy rate in Albania was 98.7%; the male literacy rate was 99.2% and female literacy rate was 98.3%.

Education for primary (arsimi fillor), secondary (arsimi i mesëm), and tertiary (arsimi universitar) levels are mostly supported by the state. The academic year is similar to that of the United States. Classes start in September or October and ends in June or July. Albanian is the primary language of instruction in all public schools. Education takes place in three stages, the primary, secondary, and pre-university education. The primary education is obligatory from grade 1 to 9. Students must pass the graduation exams at the end of the 9th grade in order to continue their education. After the primary school, the general education is provided at the secondary schools. Students get prepared for the Matura examination, allowing them to obtain their matura diploma, which grants admission to higher education. The country follows the Bologna model in accordance with the 2007 Law on 'Higher Education'. These institutions can be public or private, and may offer one, two or three levels of higher education depending on the institution.

Health 

Albania has a universal health care system. In 2000, Albania had the world's 55th best healthcare performance.

According to the World Health Organization (WHO), Albania ranks around the 40th in the world in terms of life expectancy. Compared to other Western countries, Albania has a low rate of obesity, probably thanks to the health benefits of the Mediterranean diet.

Source: UN World Population Prospects

Diaspora 

Albanians have established communities in many regions throughout southern Europe. The modern Albanian diaspora was formed largely in the 15th century, when many Albanians emigrated to southern Italy, especially in Sicily and Calabria also to Greece, to escape either various socio-political difficulties and the Ottoman conquest. Other destinations include the US, Canada, Argentina and Turkey.

Over the last twenty years, Albania has experienced major demographic changes, having the highest population growth in Europe following the collapse of communism in the country. Albania has also shifted to population decline since the changes. However, during the final days of the transition from a communism to a capitalism in 1990, over a million Albanians moved to foreign countries. These include Australia, Canada, France, Germany, Italy, the Nordic countries, Switzerland and the United Kingdom. About 440,000 of them settling in Greece, where Albanians make up 60% of immigrants. 350,000 Albanians have migrated to Italy over the 1990s to 2000s, however the number has increased substantially. The situation in Kosovo is similar. More than a million Albanians have left Kosovo since the late 1980s permanently, not counting those fleeing the Kosovo War who have subsequently returned. Important destinations for emigrating Albanians from Kosovo have been Switzerland and Germany.

See also 
 Albanian diaspora
 Demographics of Greece
 Demographics of Kosovo
 Demographics of Montenegro
 Demographics of North Macedonia
 Demographics of Serbia

References

External links

 Institute of Statistics of Albania (INSTAT)
 Population Cartogram of Albania